Koroda is a rural locality (a selo) and the administrative centre of Korodinsky Selsoviet, Gunibsky District, Republic of Dagestan, Russia. The population was 939 as of 2010. There are 2 streets.

Geography 
Koroda is located 35 km northwest of Gunib (the district's administrative centre) by road, on the Kunada River. Karadakh and Uzdalroso are the nearest rural localities.

References 

Rural localities in Gunibsky District